Yuliya Bogdanova (born 27 April 1964 in Leningrad) is a Russian former swimmer who competed in the 1980 Summer Olympics. she went on to win the bronze medal in the 200 metres breaststroke in 1980 Summer Olympics and she won gold medal of 100 m breaststroke  in 1978 World Aquatics Championships.

References

1964 births
Living people
Russian female breaststroke swimmers
Swimmers from Saint Petersburg
Olympic swimmers of the Soviet Union
Swimmers at the 1980 Summer Olympics
Olympic bronze medalists for the Soviet Union
Olympic bronze medalists in swimming
World Aquatics Championships medalists in swimming
European Aquatics Championships medalists in swimming
Medalists at the 1980 Summer Olympics
Soviet female breaststroke swimmers